The Müglitz is a river, about  long, and a left tributary of the Elbe in the German state of Saxony.

Course 
The name Sörnitz comes from Slavic zornice 'mill stream'. During severe weather on 8 July 1927 the stream became a torrent that tore up the ground, changed its riverbed, and flowed down the valley as a mud flow.

It flows by several villages including  (a district of Altenberg), Glashütte, Müglitztal, and Dohna, before emptying into the Elbe at Heidenau.

See also
 List of rivers of Saxony

Sources 
 Deutsche Akademie der Wissenschaften zu Berlin [Ed.]: Um Altenberg, Geising und Lauenstein. Werte der deutschen Heimat, Band 7. Berlin 1964.
 Martin Ernst & Manfred Stephan: Rezente Hochflutsedimente der Müglitz südlich Dresden (Erzgebirge, Sachsen) im Vergleich mit Sandsteinbänken der Erdgeschichte. Jahresberichte und Mitteilungen des Oberrheinischen Geologischen Vereins, Neue Folge, 89: 11–35, Stuttgart 2007.
 Jürgen Helfricht: Wahre Geschichten um Sachsens schönstes Tal. Tauchaer Verlag, Taucha 2000, .

External links 
 The 2002 flood in the Müglitz valley

Rivers of Saxony
Climbing areas of Germany
Rivers of the Ústí nad Labem Region
Rivers of Germany